The Faculty of Law in Maribor is a member of the University of Maribor. It was founded in 1960 as a higher law school for education of lawyers in commercial entities. In 1990 it was re-established as a high law school in Maribor with a programme for education of lawyers of universal profile. Since 1993 its official name is Faculty of Law. In 2009 it started with internationally comparable Bologna programmes.

Research 
The research priority of the Faculty of Law is "Legal Aspects of the Digital Economy". The research work at the Faculty of Law is organised within applied research institutes and a research group at the faculty level. The research group is publicly financed by Slovenian Research Agency. Researchers are also involved in research within EU financed programmes like Civil Justice/JustT, Jean Monnet, and TEMPUS.

The Faculty of Law annually co-organizes three scientific conferences:
 Medicine and Law
 Corporate Entities in the Market
 Law and Economics

The Faculty of Law publishes two ESCI indexed journals:
 Medicine, Law & Society 
 Lexonomica 

The Faculty of Law is a co-publisher of SCI indexed journal Lex Localis.

References

External links
Official website

Faculties of the University of Maribor
1960 establishments in Slovenia
Law schools in Slovenia